Eccopidia is a monotypic snout moth genus. Its single species, Eccopidia strigata, is found in Sri Lanka. Both the genus and species were described by George Hampson in 1899.

References

Phycitinae
Monotypic moth genera
Moths of Asia